Tickle is an American docudrama television series that aired in 2013 on the Discovery Channel. A spin-off of Moonshiners, the series follows moonshiner Steven Ray Tickle as he attempts to sell a large stash of moonshine that he found in the backwoods of Virginia. Tickle opens a fishing store called "Tickle's Tackle" in the town of Gretna as a front to move the liquor, but discovers that managing a business is more difficult than he expected.

Episodes

All episode ratings from Zap2it.

References

Television shows set in Virginia
Discovery Channel original programming
2010s American reality television series
2013 American television series debuts
2013 American television series endings
Pittsylvania County, Virginia
Works about Appalachia